Brechin Victoria Junior Football Club are a Scottish Junior football club based in Brechin, Angus. Their home ground is Victoria Park. The club have recently celebrated their centenary year 1917–2017. They enjoy links with the community and Brechin Youth Clubs to promote and work on the player development and pathway from  grass roots to first team level.

Up until the end of the 2005–06 season, they played in Tayside Division One of the Scottish Junior Football Association's East Region.  The SJFA restructured prior to the 2006–07 season, and Vics found themselves in the twelve-team East Region, North Division. They finished 12th in their first season in the division. They currently play in the East Region Premier League North League after league re-construction.

The team are managed since October 2018 by former Scotland Junior international goalkeeper Iain Ross.

Honours

Currie (Findlay & Co) Cup: 1979–80
Tayside Regional Cup: 1979–80
Angus Junior League: 1924–25, 1925–26, 1926–27, 1927–28, 1929–30, 1934–35, 1950–51 *Division One Rosebank Car Centre Cup: 1998–99
Arbroath & District Cup: 1961–62
Brechin Rosebowl: 1928–29, 1929–30, 1934–35, 1950–51, 1951–52, 1961–62, 1965–66
Forfar & District Cup: 1924–25, 1936–37
Forfar Businessman's Trophy: 1969–70

References

External links
 Club website

 
Football clubs in Scotland
Scottish Junior Football Association clubs
Association football clubs established in 1917
Football clubs in Angus, Scotland
1917 establishments in Scotland
Brechin